John James Haselden (3 August 1943 – 30 March 2020) was an English professional footballer, manager and physiotherapist. As a player, he was a central defender.

Playing career
Haselden played the professional game for 13 years and played for Doncaster Rovers, Rotherham United and had a loan spell at Mansfield Town.

Rotherham United
Haselden started his career at Rotherham United in 1961. He spent 7 years at Rotherham and played 99 games. He then moved to hometown club Doncaster Rovers in 1968.

Doncaster Rovers
Doncaster Rovers were Haselden's hometown club and he was to make 172 appearances in the next 6 years. He also scored 20 goals. He also had a loan spell at Mansfield between 1971 and 1972 where he played 4 games. In 1974, he retired from the game and joined Mansfield Town's coaching staff.

Reading
In 1987, Haselden had a run-out in a friendly at Reading, where he was working as a coach, at the age of 45.

Coaching career

Mansfield Town
Haselden was Mansfield Town's First Team Coach and in his first season as coach Mansfield won the Fourth Division title.

Huddersfield Town
Haselden joined Huddersfield Town in 1976 as a physiotherapist/coach under Tom Johnston and was promoted to the manager's role in 1977 when the club's board voted him into the hot-seat. This role only lasted six months, though as Johnston came back to Huddersfield for a third time in 1977. In 1978 and when Johnston took Town to 91st in The Football League he retired and Mick Buxton was brought in as caretaker manager. When Buxton was given the role full-time he made Haselden his assistant manager and in their full season at the helm Town won the Fourth Division title. Town also gained promotion from Division Three in 1983. In 1986 Haselden was sacked by Town to free up the club's wage bill.

Reading
In 1986 Haselden joined Reading's coaching staff. He took caretaker charge of Reading in 1991 for a couple of weeks. He left Reading in 1993 to join Nottingham Forest.

Managerial statistics
As of 9 April 2009.

Nottingham Forest
Haselden joined Forest as a physiotherapist where he worked for nine years before leaving to join Aston Villa in 2002. He left in 2004 for Notts County. He spent 4 years at Notts before being replaced by Paul Smith in July 2008.

Honours

Player
Doncaster Rovers
 Fourth Division champions: 1968–69

Coach/physio
Mansfield Town
 Fourth Division champions: 1974–75
Huddersfield Town
 Third Division runners-up: 1982–83
 Fourth Division champions: 1979–80
Reading
 Simod Cup: 1987–88

External links
Profile on a Huddersfield Town fansite (via archive.org)

References

1943 births
2020 deaths
Footballers from Doncaster
English footballers
Association football defenders
Rotherham United F.C. players
Doncaster Rovers F.C. players
Mansfield Town F.C. players
English Football League players
English football managers
Huddersfield Town A.F.C. managers
Reading F.C. managers
Association football physiotherapists
Huddersfield Town A.F.C. non-playing staff